Luke Mafuwa Jongwe (born 6 February 1995) is a Zimbabwean cricketer. He is a  right-handed batter and right-arm medium pace bowler.

Jongwe was selected for three ODIs against South Africa. He made his One Day International debut at Harare Sports Club against South Africa on 17 August 2014, where he bowled six overs and gave away 45 runs without taking a wicket and then scored 19 runs in a losing cause. He made his Twenty20 International debut against Pakistan on 27 September 2015.

In December 2020, Jongwe was selected to play for the Tuskers in the 2020–21 Logan Cup. In April 2021, Jongwe was named in Zimbabwe's squad for their Twenty20 International (T20I) series against Pakistan, more than five years since his last international match. On 26 April 2021, Jongwe was named in Zimbabwe's Test squad, also for the series against Pakistan. He made his Test debut for Zimbabwe, against Pakistan, on 7 May 2021.

References

External links
 

1995 births
Living people
Zimbabwean cricketers
Zimbabwe Test cricketers
Zimbabwe One Day International cricketers
Zimbabwe Twenty20 International cricketers
Sportspeople from Harare
Southern Rocks cricketers
Matabeleland Tuskers cricketers